The Stits SA-1A Junior is a world's smallest monoplane designed by Ray Stits and piloted by Robert H. Starr.

References

External links

Homebuilt aircraft